Daniel Ionuț Novac (born 26 September 1987) is a Romanian footballer who plays as a midfielder for Liga III side Ceahlăul Piatra Neamț.

Honours
Victoria Brănești
Liga II: 2009–10
CSMS Iași
Liga II: 2013–14
FC Voluntari
Liga II: 2014–15
Romanian Cup: 2016–17
Romanian Supercup: 2017

Chindia Târgoviște
Liga II: 2018–19

References

External links
 
 

1987 births
Living people
Footballers from Bucharest
Romanian footballers
Association football midfielders
Liga I players
Liga II players
Liga III players
CS Inter Gaz București players
CS Brănești players
ASC Oțelul Galați players
FC Sportul Studențesc București players
CS Concordia Chiajna players
FC Politehnica Iași (2010) players
FC Voluntari players
AFC Chindia Târgoviște players
FC Universitatea Cluj players
ACS Foresta Suceava players
CSM Ceahlăul Piatra Neamț players